Petro Yosypovych Panch (born  in Valky, Kharkov Governorate, Russian Empire – died 1 December 1978 in Kyiv, Ukrainian SSR of the Soviet Union) was a Ukrainian writer and playwright, one of founders of the Ukrainian Soviet literature. Member of the Soviet Writers' Union and the Writer's Union of Ukraine, former sotnik of the Ukrainian People's Army.

External links
 Herasymova, H.P. Petro Panch. "Encyclopedia of History of Ukraine".

1891 births
1978 deaths
People from Valky
People from Valkovsky Uyezd
Ukrainian people in the Russian Empire
Russian military personnel of World War I
Ukrainian people of World War I
Military officers of the Ukrainian People's Republic
Ukrainian writers
Ukrainian dramatists and playwrights
Recipients of the Shevchenko National Prize
Recipients of the Order of Lenin
Burials at Baikove Cemetery